Live At Ernesto's is an album by The Slackers released in 2000 by Hellcat Records.  The album was recorded live March 8 and 9, 1999 at a restaurant called Ernesto's in Sittard, the Netherlands.

Artwork
Interior artwork features two collages. Collages appear to be a collection of tour photos and mementos. The photographs are by Denny Renshaw, and have been assembled and rephotographed by him.  Unlike the exciting inside jackets for this record, the cover is mostly forgettable, notable only as being the first departure from the "Wix series" of covers (Better Late Than Never through The Question).

Track listing
 "Intro"  – 0:16
 "Sooner or Later"  – 4:00
 "Married Girl"  – 3:15
 "Do You Know"  – 3:08
 "Sarah"  – 3:46
 "Mush One"  – 1:21
 "I Still Love You"  – 3:16
 "Soldier"  – 2:59
 "Keep Him Away"  – 2:47
 "Work Song"  – 6:07
 "Feed My Girl"  – 3:43
 "Face In My Crowd"  – 3:34
 "You Don't Know I"  – 7:18
 "Pedophilia"  – 6:23
 "Runaway"  – 4:12
 "The Fried Chicken Song"  – 5:51

2000 live albums
The Slackers live albums